Jomboy may refer to:
 Jomboy (sports media), an American sports media personality
 Jomboy District, a district of Uzbekistan
 Jomboy, Uzbekistan, a small town within that district